Macduff is a town in the Banff and Buchan area  of Aberdeenshire, Scotland. It is situated on Banff Bay and faces the town of Banff across the estuary of the River Deveron. Macduff is a former burgh and was the last place in the United Kingdom where deep-water wooden fishing boats were built.

History
The settlement of Doune (from the Scottish Gaelic , "hill fort") was purchased in 1732 by William Duff, who became the first Earl Fife. In 1760, James Duff, the second earl, built a harbour there and in 1783 succeeded in raising Doune to the status of a burgh of barony, renaming it "Macduff" after his supposed ancestor. The 2nd Earl Fife appointed his factor, William Rose, as the first Provost of Macduff in 1783. The town celebrated its bicentenary in 1983, and the signs erected in that year still stand on the main approaches to the town (most visibly, a large sign next to the Banff Bridge on the Macduff side).

Banff and Macduff are separated by the valley of the River Deveron. This unpredictable river was finally tamed by the seven-arched bridge completed in 1799 by John Smeaton. An earlier bridge had been built in 1765, but was swept away in 1768. The old ferry was brought back into use, until it was lost in a flood in 1773.
Early area prehistory is manifested by the nearby ancient monument at Longman Hill, a large long barrow somewhat to the southeast of Macduff.

Attractions
The town has an aquarium, a maritime heritage centre and a golf course (Royal Tarlair).
COAST Festival of the Visual Arts is an annual festival of weekend-long events and attractions in both Banff and Macduff. It runs over the bank holiday weekend at the end of May each year.
The town once had an outdoor swimming pool Tarlair Swimming Pool which has fallen into disuse. Locals on the Facebook social network site have created a group to begin the fight to "Save Tarlair". 
Many of the nearby villages also contribute to tourism in the area; in particular Gardenstown and Pennan.

Architecture

Macduff Town Hall, on Shore Street, is a Category B listed building constructed in 1884.

Lifeboat

Macduff has an RNLI lifeboat station which is equipped with an  inshore lifeboat, Lydia Macdonald. The Macduff lifeboat is unique within the Royal National Lifeboat Institution, being the only inshore lifeboat that is stored on, launched and recovered from a LGV fitted with its own crane. This allows the lifeboat to be launched and recovered from different locations along the coast should the need arise.

Railways

Macduff was served from 1860 by the Banff, Macduff and Turriff Junction Railway, later absorbed by the Great North of Scotland Railway (GNSR) which at first ran to Banff & Macduff station, almost  from the town. In 1872 the line to Banff & Macduff station benefited from a replacement station closer to the town centre; Macduff railway station opened, and the original station closed on 1 July 1872. The preceding station before the terminus in Macduff was Banff Bridge railway station, placed near the bridge between Banff and Macduff. Banff itself was served by another station, Banff Harbour (later just Banff), and since this was on a separate line (originally belonging to the Banff, Portsoy and Strathisla Railway, though later absorbed by the GNSR), it also provided an alternative route that came close to Macduff.

All the lines suffered from mid-20th century railway cuts, with Macduff station closing by the end of 1961.

Sport
Macduff has a golf course known as Royal Tarlair which was built on land which ends on precipitous cliffs so lost balls really are lost. It is home to the famous 13th hole called The Clivet.

In 2016 the Macduff Sports and Community Centre was opened. It houses a 4G AstroTurf pitch with an indoor tennis court sized hall.

Macduff have a new welfare football club called Macduff AFC. They play their home games at the new Macduff Sports Centre.

See also
 B9031 road
 Burn of Myrehouse
 William Duff's Duff House (across the River Deveron in neighbouring Banff)

Notable residents
 Colin Newton (born 1977), a drummer
 Sandi Thom (born 1981), a singer-songwriter
 Matthew Cooper (born 1994), a professional footballer
Dr Eilidh Whiteford (born 1969), SNP politician. Member of the UK Parliament for Banff and Buchan from 2010 to 2017
 Walford Bodie (1869–1939), magician and showman, Manor House Macduff 1905 to 1939

References

External links

 COAST festival
 

 
Towns in Aberdeenshire
Royal burghs
Fishing communities in Scotland